Priscilla Lee Kelly (born June 5, 1997) is an American professional wrestler, currently signed to WWE. She performs under the ring name Gigi Dolin in the NXT brand, and is a former member of Toxic Attraction with Jacy Jayne, and she is a former record-tying two-time NXT Women's Tag Team Champion with Jayne. 

Before signing with WWE, Kelly worked for Major League Wrestling (MLW). She is best known for her appearances in Shine Wrestling, where she is a former Shine Nova Champion.

Early life
Priscilla Lee Kelly was born into a family of Romanichal descent in Douglasville, Georgia, on June 5, 1997. She left school at the age of 12. When she was 14 years old, she took part in the first season of the reality show My Big Fat American Gypsy Wedding, in which she was the main focus of the episode "14 and Looking for Mr. Right". She would later say that the program had misrepresented her. Her younger brother, who has autism, introduced her to professional wrestling; she has said her motivation in wrestling is to give her brother a better life.

Professional wrestling career

Independent circuit (2015–2021)
Kelly made her professional wrestling debut in March 2015 in a tag team match, where she and Devyn Nicole lost to Amanda Rodriguez and Amber O'Neal. In June, she was defeated by Kiera Hogan. In May 2016, she was defeated by Kimber Lee. In December 2016, she defeated Tessa Blanchard. In September 2016, Kelly made her Women Superstars Uncensored debut where she and Nevaeh lost to Samantha Heights and Brittany Blake. At Breaking Barriers 4, she defeated Penelope Ford and Renee Michelle. In August 2017, she defeated Leva Bates. Later that month, she defended her Shine Nova title against Jordynne Grace. In December, Kelly, Cheerleader Melissa and Mercedes Martinez defeated Laurel Van Ness, Delilah Doom and Deonna Purrazzo. In April 2018, she made her DDT Pro-Wrestling debut where she, Toru Owashi, and Kazuki Hirata were defeated by Saki Akai, Yukio Sakaguchi and Masahiro Takanashi.

In December 2018, Kelly wrestled a match against Tuna for the Suburban Fight promotion in Los Angeles. During the match, with Tuna laid out on a steel chair, Kelly pulled out a bloody tampon from her tights and stuck it in Tuna's mouth. Footage of the match received little attention for over a week until fellow wrestler Gail Kim commented on Twitter in disgust, after which the footage went viral. Wrestling veterans such as Jim Ross, Angelina Love, and Tessa Blanchard also commented negatively, while Gregory Helms jokingly asked if it was a "First Blood Match". Kelly defended the angle, stating that it took place in a bar that required audience members to be 21 or older and that it was simply for entertainment, confirming that the tampon's use was a scripted event in the match and that it was not actually a used tampon. She later commented that women are held to a double standard compared to men, citing Joey Ryan sticking a lollipop into numerous wrestlers' mouths after pulling it out of his tights. Her sentiments were echoed by Reby Sky. Figures such as Tommy Dreamer, Tazz, and Ryan came to Kelly's defense, all stating that she did her job and it worked. Road Dogg initially criticized her for the angle until Ryan called him out over similar angles during the Attitude Era, notably the infamous Mae Young "birthing a hand" angle, after which he publicly apologized to her.

In July 2019, Kelly defeated James Ellsworth to become the World Intergender Champion at Cactus League Wrestling's "Rated R Wrestling" event in Tucson, Arizona.

In November 2019, Kelly debuted for Major League Wrestling as the evil Spider Lady; losing to Zeda Zhang via disqualification and attacking Zhang while unmasking.

Shine (2016–2019)
In September 2016, Kelly made her Shine Wrestling debut at Shine 37 defeating Dominique Fabiano. Later that night, Kelly and Fabiano were defeated by then Shine Tag Team Champions, Jayme Jameson and Marti Belle. At Shine 39, Kelly was defeated by Malia Hosaka. In July 2017, Kelly became the inaugural Shine Nova Champion after winning the Shine Nova Championship Tournament where she defeated Veda Scott in the first round, Leah Vaughan in the second round, Kiera Hogan in the semi finals, and Candy Cartwright in the tournament finals. At Shine 46, she defeated Santana Garrett to retain the Nova championship. At Shine 49, Kelly lost the Nova title to Candy Cartright. At Shine 51, she defeated Holidead.

In January 2017, Kelly made her Full Impact Pro debut in a loss to Aria Blake. At Heatstroke 2017, Kelly successfully defended her Shine Nova championship against Stormie Lee.

In May 2017, she made her Evolve debut at Evolve 95, losing to Allysin Kay.

She made her Style Battle debut defeating Dani J in August 2017.

Tokyo Joshi Pro Wrestling (2018–2019)
Kelly made her debut for the Japanese Promotion Tokyo Joshi Pro Wrestling in April 2018, losing to the Dragon Bombers (Maho Kurone & Rika Tatsumi) in a Tag Team Match alongside Hyper Misao. She has since worked matches on several occasions in Japan, all under the umbrella of the DDT Pro-Wrestling Promotion, her latest match being a loss in the Tokyo Princess of Princess Championship Match against Miyu Yamashita on October 14. On October 10, 2018, Ethan Page, MAO, Mike Bailey and Kelly defeated Jun Kasai, Akito, Masahiro Takanashi and Saki Akai.

All Elite Wrestling (2019, 2020)
Kelly made a surprise appearance at All Out, participating in the Casino Battle Royal. She also faced Britt Baker in a losing effort on the January 23, 2020 episode of AEW Dynamite which was filmed from Chris Jericho's Rock 'N' Wrestling Rager at Sea Part Deux: Second Wave.

WWE (2018, 2021–present)

Mae Young Classic (2018) 
On July 30, 2018, it was announced that Kelly would be a participant in WWE's second Mae Young Classic. She lost against Deonna Purrazzo in the first round.

Toxic Attraction (2021–2023) 

On January 20, 2021, NXT announced they had signed Kelly, where she would be competing under the ring name Gigi Dolin and debut with her participation in the Women's Dusty Rhodes Tag Team Classic.  She teamed up with fellow new signee Cora Jade in the tournament, where they faced and lost to The Way (Candice LeRae and Indi Hartwell) in the first round. On the July 27 episode of NXT, Dolin would form an alliance with Mandy Rose and Jacy Jayne, dubbed as Toxic Attraction. At Halloween Havoc, Dolin and Jayne defeated Io Shirai and Zoey Stark, and Indi Hartwell and Persia Pirotta in a triple threat tag team Scareway to Hell Ladder match to win the NXT Women's Tag Team Championship.

On the NXT Stand & Deliver Kickoff, Gigi and Jacy lost the NXT Women's Tag Team Championship to Dakota Kai and Raquel González with the help from Wendy Choo's interference, ending their reign at 158 days. However, they regained the titles with the help of Mandy Rose's distraction three days later.

At NXT: The Great American Bash on July 5, Gigi and Jacy lost the NXT Women's Tag Team Championship to Roxanne Perez and Cora Jade. After the titles were vacated, Gigi and Jacy participated in a Fatal Four-Way Elimination Match on the August 2 episode of NXT 2.0, against Ivy Nile & Tatum Paxley, Yulisa Leon & Valentina Feroz, and Katana Chance & Kayden Carter. Gigi and Jacy were part of the final two teams in the match but eventually lost to Katana & Kayden.

On the August 19, 2022 episode of SmackDown, Dolin made her main roster debut alongside Jacy Jayne as participants in the WWE Women's Tag Team Championship Tournament. They would win the first match but were forced out of the tournament due to an injury suffered by Dolin. Dolin and Jayne made their return to SmackDown in a losing effort against new WWE Women's Tag Team Champions Aliyah and Raquel Rodriguez. At NXT: New Year's Evil on January 10, 2023, Dolin and Jayne were declared co-winners of a 20-woman battle royal after eliminating each other simultaneously, earning an NXT Women's Championship match against Roxanne Perez in a triple threat match at NXT Vengeance Day, where Perez successfully retained her title.

Face turn (2023–present) 
On the February 7, 2023, edition of NXT, during a Ding Dong, Hello! segment hosted by Bayley, Dolin and Jayne appeared to reconcile. But Jayne turned on Dolin, hitting Dolin with a "Thirst Kick". Jayne then stomped Dolin though the door of the Ding Dong, Hello! set, ending Toxic Attraction and subsequently turning Dolin into a face for the first time in her career. Dolin faced Jayne at NXT Roadblock on March 7 with Dolin winning the match.

Professional wrestling persona and style
Kelly's gimmick was initially based on her past and appearance on My Big Fat American Gypsy Wedding, leading her to use the nicknames "Gypsy Princess" and "Gypsy Queen". However, her persona has since adopted more of a gothic and sexual tone, and is now more based on a succubus. She uses the nickname "Hell's Favorite Harlot", and is known for using tactics such as biting and licking opponents during matches as a way to psyche them out. She has often been compared physically to former WWE wrestler Paige, who also licked her opponents. As well as being a professional wrestler, Kelly is also a valet and most notably valeted Austin Theory.

Personal life
On November 21, 2018, Kelly married fellow professional wrestler Samuel Ratsch, who is best known by his ring name Darby Allin. She announced in August 2020 that they were divorcing. During an interview on Vickie Guerrero's podcast four months later, she confirmed that she and Allin were no longer married but remained friends.

Championships and accomplishments

F1RST Wrestling
F1RST Wrestling Uptown VFW Championship (1 time)
Georgia Premier Wrestling
Together We Fight Tournament (1 time) - with Chip Day
Grim's Toy Show Wrestling
GTS Intergender Championship (1 time)
Pro Wrestling Illustrated
Ranked No. 38 of the top 100 female wrestlers in the PWI Women's 100 in 2020
Rogue Wrestling
Rogue Tag Team Championship (1 time) - with Vipress
Shine Wrestling
Shine Nova Championship (1 time)
SHINE Nova Championship Inaugural Tournament (2017)
 WWE
 NXT Women's Tag Team Championship (2 times) – with Jacy Jayne

References

External links
 
 
 
 

1997 births
21st-century American actresses
American female professional wrestlers
American people of Romani descent
Living people
Participants in American reality television series
Professional wrestlers from Georgia (U.S. state)
Romanichal
Sportspeople from Georgia (U.S. state)
NXT Women's Tag Team Champions
21st-century professional wrestlers
American Romani people
People from Douglasville, Georgia